Shandak, also rendered as Shandaq, also known as Shandak Ghaleh Bid or Shandak Morad Abad, may refer to:
 Hasanabad-e Shandak
 Jadidabad-e Shandak